Canadian Bound (April 29, 1975 – 1992) was the first Thoroughbred yearling racehorse ever to be sold for more than US$1 million. He was part of the first crop of foals Secretariat. He proved to be of little use as a racehorse, managing one second-place finish in three starts in France and running unplaced in his only race in the United States.

Background
Canadian Bound was bred by Texas oilman Nelson Bunker Hunt. His dam was Charming Alibi, who was also the dam of Hunt's great Hall of Fame filly, Dahlia.

There was much excitement over the unnamed colt when he was sent to the 1976 Keeneland July sale and the opening bid of $716,000 broke the previous record set a year earlier. The bidding for the yearling broke the $1 million barrier for the first time, and he ended up being sold for $1.5 million ($ million inflation adjusted) to Canadians Ted Burnett and Hill 'n' Dale Farms' John Sikura, Jr. He was sent to race in France with trainer Maurice Zilber.

Racing career
Canadian Bound began racing at two, finishing second on his only start. He finished out of the money in both of his 1978 starts. At age four, he was sent to Hollywood Park Racetrack in California, where in the final race of his career, he finished fourth.

Stud record
Retired to stud, in 1982 Canadian Bound stood at the Stallion Station near Lexington, Kentucky. He was not successful as a sire.  He died in 1992.

Pedigree

References

 July 20, 2006 Bloodhorse.com article titled A Memorable Date: First Seven-Figure Yearling Sold
Toronto star article on John Sikura and Canadian Bound

1975 racehorse births
1992 racehorse deaths
Racehorses bred in Kentucky
Racehorses trained in France
Racehorses trained in the United States
Thoroughbred family 13-c